Dąbrowa  is a village in the administrative district of Gmina Wieluń, within Wieluń County, Łódź Voivodeship, in central Poland.

The village has a population of 1,000.

References

Villages in Wieluń County